Col de Marie-Blanque (elevation ) is a mountain pass in the western Pyrenees in the department of Pyrénées-Atlantiques in France. The pass is situated south-east of Oloron-Sainte-Marie and connects the valleys of the Aspe and the Ossau rivers.

Details of the climb 
The western side of the climb, starts from Escot on the N134. Although relatively short, there are several long sections with gradients in excess of 11%.

Over this distance, it gains   at an average gradient of 4.1%. En route, the climb passes the Plateau de Bénou.

Tour de France 
The pass was first used in the Tour de France in 1978 and has been crossed 15 times by the tour, including on stage 9 of the 2020 tour from Pau to Laruns.

Appearances in Tour de France

References

External links
Preview Stage 17 2010 Tour de France with Cycling Profile for Marie-Blanque  
Profiles and Tour de France appearances
Col de Marie-Blanque on Google Maps (Tour de France classic climbs)

Mountain passes of Nouvelle-Aquitaine
Mountain passes of the Pyrenees